They Who Dare is a 1954 British Second World War war film directed by Lewis Milestone and starring Dirk Bogarde, Denholm Elliott and Akim Tamiroff. The story is based on Operation Anglo that took place during World War II in the Dodecanese islands where special forces attempted to disrupt the Luftwaffe from threatening Allied forces in Egypt. It was released by British Lion Films and in the United States by Allied Artists. The title of the film is a reference to the motto of the Special Air Service: "Who Dares Wins".

Plot
During the Second World War, Lieutenant Graham is sent on a mission to destroy two Italian airfields on Rhodes that may threaten Egypt. Under his command, a group of six Special Boat Service, two Greek officers and two local guides are assembled.

The group is taken to Rhodes by submarine and comes ashore at night on a desolate beach. From there, the group has to traverse the mountains to reach its targets. At a pre-designated location, the party splits into two raiding parties. After having infiltrated the air bases, they blow up the aircraft, but two of the raiders are taken prisoner by the Italians.

Hunted by the many enemy patrols, eight of the group are captured and only two, Lieutenant Graham and Sergeant Corcoran, make it back to the pick-up point where they are rescued by the submarine, despite the presence of an unwelcome enemy patrol boat.

Cast

Dirk Bogarde as Lieut. Graham
Denholm Elliott as Sgt. Corcoran
Akim Tamiroff as Captain George One
Harold Siddons as Lieut. Stevens R.N.
Eric Pohlmann as Captain Papadapoulos
William Russell (credited as Russell Enoch) as Lieut. Poole
Gérard Oury as Captain George Two
Sam Kydd as Marine Boyd
Peter Burton as Marine Barrett
David Peel as Sgt. Evans
Michael Mellinger as Toplis
Alec Mango as Patroklis
Anthea Leigh as Marika
Eileen Way as Greek woman
Lisa Gastoni as George Two's girlfriend
Kay Callard as nightclub singer
 Robert Rietty as 	Italian Officer
 Christopher Rhodes as German Officer

Production
They Who Dare was partly shot on location in Cyprus and Malta with Walter Milner Barry, a former SBS officer as technical adviser. A survivor of the raid, David Sutherland, provided a copy of his after action report to screenwriter Robert Westerby. The interiors were shot at Shepperton Studios near London. The film's sets were designed by the art director Donald M. Ashton.

They Who Dare was re-written by Lewis Milestone. When he handed in the film, producer Setton re-edited it. The film was poorly received critically. Dirk Bogarde recalled one film reviewer referred to it as How Dare They in his review.

The Lebanese Air Force provided a pair of Savoia-Marchetti SM.79 aircraft for the film. Bogarde recalled Lewis Milestone insisting on the cast wearing actual 90 pound/40 kilogram backpacks as he felt actors could not convincingly act as if they were carrying a large amount of weight. The cast had a week of exercises with the packs as the script was polished but the weight was reduced to 60 lbs/27 kg.

Reception
Film reviewer Hal Erickson in his appraisal of They Who Dare, said the film was, "... undeservedly the least-known of director Lewis Milestone's sound films. Set in the Aegean sea during World War II, the film recounts the exploits of Britain's Special Boat Squadron. ... Robert Westerby is credited with the screenplay of 'They Who Dare', and Lewis Milestone insisted the story was taken verbatim from the reminiscences of the squadron's two survivors."

References

Notes

Citations

External links

1954 films
1950s war films
British aviation films
British war films
Films directed by Lewis Milestone
Films set in Axis-occupied Greece
Films set on islands
Films set in the Mediterranean Sea
Dodecanese campaign
Films shot in Cyprus
Films shot in Malta
Films shot at Shepperton Studios
British Lion Films films
1950s English-language films
1950s British films